Year 1108 (MCVIII) was a leap year starting on Wednesday (link will display the full calendar) of the Julian calendar.

Events 
 By place 

 Europe 
 Spring – King Sigurd I (the Crusader) sails from England, on the Norwegian Crusade to Palestine. He repels a Muslim fleet near the Tagus River, then attacks Sintra, Lisbon and Alcácer do Sal, and finally defeats a second Muslim fleet further south.
 May 29 – Battle of Uclés: Almoravid forces defeat the armies of Castile and León. The advance of the Reconquista is halted, and the Berbers re-capture the towns of Uclés, Cuenca, Huete and Ocaña. The Christians, many of nobility, are beheaded.
 July 29 – King Philip I (the Amorous) dies at Melun, after a 48-year reign. He is succeeded by his son Louis VI (the Fat), who, at the start of his rule, faces insurrections from feudal brigands and rebellious robber barons.
 September – Siege of Dyrrhachium: Italo-Norman forces under Bohemond I lift the siege due to illness and lack of supplies. Bohemond becomes a vassal of the Byzantine Empire by signing the Treaty of Devol.
 Autumn – The Principality of Nitra ceases to exist, after King Coloman (the Learned) of Hungary, deposes its last ruler, Álmos, duke of Croatia.
 The consuls of Bergamo are first mentioned, indicating that the city has become an independent commune in Lombardy (Northern Italy).

 Levant 
 Summer – Jawali Saqawa, Turkish ruler (atabeg) of Mosul, accepts a ransom of 30,000 dinar by Count Joscelin I and releases his cousin Baldwin II, count of Edessa, who is held as prisoner (see 1104).
 Baldwin I marches out against Sidon, with the support of a squadron of sailor-adventurers from various Italian cities. A Fatimid fleet from Egypt defeats the Italians in a sea-battle outside the harbour.

 Asia 
 The Taira and Minamoto clans join forces to rule Japan, after defeating the warrior monks of the Enryaku-ji temple near Kyoto. The Taira replace many Fujiwara nobles in important offices – while the Minamoto gain more military experience by bringing parts of Northern Honshu under Japanese control (approximate date).

 By topic 

 Religion 
 Chichester Cathedral is consecrated under Ralph de Luffa, bishop of Chichester, in England.
 Construction begins on the tower of Winchester Cathedral, building continues until 1120.
 Pistoia Cathedral in Italy is damaged by a severe fire.
 June 13 – Restored Ferentino Cathedral in Italy is consecrated.

Births 
 Andronikos Komnenos, Byzantine prince (d. 1142)
 Baldwin IV (the Builder), count of Hainaut (d. 1171)
 Bohemond II, Italo-Norman prince of Antioch (d. 1130)
 Derbforgaill (or Derval), Irish princess (d. 1193)
 Ghiyath ad-Din Mas'ud, Seljuk sultan (d. 1152)
 Henry X (the Proud), duke of Bavaria (d. 1139)
 Leopold IV (the Generous), duke of Bavaria (d. 1141)

Deaths 
 January 4 – Gertrude, Grand Princess of Kiev
 March 18 – Abe no Munetō, Japanese samurai (b. 1032)
 May 21 – Gerard, Norman archbishop of York
 May 29
 García Ordóñez, Castilian nobleman
 Sancho Alfónsez, Castilian nobleman
 July 5 – Guy of Hauteville, Italo-Norman diplomat
 July 29 – Philip I (the Amorous), king of France
 November 15 – Enrico Contarini, bishop of Castello
 García Álvarez, Castilian official and military leader
 Gonzalo, bishop of Mondoñedo (approximate date)
 Gregory III, count of Tusculum (approximate date)
 Gundulf, bishop of Rochester (approximate date)
 Guy II (the Red), French nobleman and crusader
 Mafalda of Pulla-Calabria, Norman noblewoman (b. 1060)
 Urse d'Abetot, Norman sheriff of Worcestershire
 Veera Ballala I, Indian ruler of the Hoysala Empire
 Wang, Chinese empress of the Song Dynasty (b. 1084)

References